The Scottish cricket team toured the United Arab Emirates to play the Netherlands in February 2016. The tour consisted of a Twenty20 International (T20I) match. The match was in preparation for the World Twenty20 in India in March and was played at the ICC Academy Ground in Dubai. Scotland won the one-off match by 37 runs.

Squads

T20I series

Only T20I

See also
 Scottish cricket team in the United Arab Emirates in 2015–16

References

2016 in Scottish cricket
2016 in Dutch cricket
International cricket competitions in 2015–16
2015-16
2015-16
Scotland 2015
2016 in Emirati cricket